Dustin Wells (born 31 May 1983) is an Australian footballer who plays for Belconnen United in the National Premier Leagues.

Club career
Wells was born in Kiama, and started playing in Canberra, joining the AIS before signing with Wollongong Wolves in the National Soccer League.  After the collapse of the NSL, Dustin played for Belconnen Blue Devils in the NSWPL, before joining the Knights.

In the 2006-07 season, he made five appearances for the Knights in November and December 2006 impressing commentators on his A-League debut.

International career
He has also represented Australia at Schoolboys and Young Socceroos (U20s) levels.

References

External links
 New Zealand Knights Profile

1983 births
Living people
Australian soccer players
Australia youth international soccer players
Australia under-20 international soccer players
A-League Men players
National Soccer League (Australia) players
New Zealand Knights FC players
National Premier Leagues players
Association football midfielders
People from the Illawarra
Sportsmen from New South Wales
Soccer players from New South Wales